Alexander 134B is an Indian reserve of the Alexander First Nation in Alberta, within Woodlands County. It is 36 kilometres northwest of Barrhead.

See also 
Alexander 134A
Alexander 134

References

Indian reserves in Alberta